Fellows (FRS) and foreign members (ForMemRS) of the Royal Society elected in 2010

Fellows

Gabriel Aeppli
Ian Affleck
Paul Brakefield
Andrea Brand
Eleanor Campbell
Philip Candelas
Peter Cawley
Nicola Susan Clayton
John William Connor
Russell Cowburn
Gideon Davies
Donald Dawson
Raymond Dolan
Hugh Durrant-Whyte
Lyndon Evans
Richard Evershed
Georg Gottlob
Ben Green
Robert Charles Griffiths
Roger Hardie
Michael Hastings
Andrew Hattersley
Craig Jon Hawker
Ronald Thomas Hay
Ian David Hickson
Peter Horton
Jeremy Hutson
Victoria Kaspi
Lewis Edward Kay
Ondrej Krivanek
Angus Iain Lamond
Alan Lehmann
Malcolm McCulloch
Robin MacGregor Murray
Robin Noel Perutz
Max Pettini
Thomas Platts-Mills
Wolf Reik
Loren Rieseberg
Peter William Jack Rigby
Ezio Rizzardo
Elizabeth Simpson
Alan Edward Smith
Eric Wolff

Foreign members

Pascale Cossart
Carl Djerassi
Ludwig Dmitrievich Faddeev
Edmond Henri Fischer
Michael Goodchild
John Bannister Goodenough
Detlef Weigel
Kurt Wuthrich

Honorary member

 Melvyn Bragg

References 
 http://royalsociety.org/about-us/fellowship/new-fellows-2010/

2010
2010 in science
2010 in the United Kingdom